Bully is a 2001 crime drama film directed by Larry Clark, and starring Brad Renfro, Bijou Phillips, Rachel Miner, Michael Pitt, Leo Fitzpatrick, Daniel Franzese, Kelli Garner, and Nick Stahl. Its plot follows a group of teenagers in South Florida who enact a murder plot against their mutual bully who has emotionally, physically, and sexually abused them for years.

The film is based on the murder of Bobby Kent, and its screenplay was adapted by David McKenna (under the pseudonym Zachary Long) and Roger Pullis from the book Bully: A True Story of High School Revenge by Jim Schutze. Filming took place in southern Florida in the summer of 2000.

Bully was given a limited release in the United States on July 14, 2001, and met with mixed critical responses, though many critics noted the film's disturbing and straightforward handling of youth crime and murder.

Plot
South Florida high school dropouts Ali Willis (Bijou Phillips) and Lisa Connelly (Rachel Miner) befriend Bobby Kent (Nick Stahl) and Marty Puccio (Brad Renfro), employees at a local deli. The four all go out on a double date. Later that evening, in Bobby's parked car, Ali performs oral sex on Bobby, while Lisa and Marty have sex in the back seat. Lisa later learns she is pregnant, but is afraid that the child is Bobby's instead of Marty's, since Bobby raped her after beating Marty unconscious.

Bobby emotionally and physically abuses Marty, who puts up with his violent tendencies. On one occasion, Bobby rapes Ali while trying to force her to watch gay male pornography with him. Lisa later tells Marty that everyone suspects Bobby is attracted to him. Marty reveals to Lisa that the abuse has been going on since they were boys, starting with Marty taking drugs at an early age, which Marty thinks that Bobby has been using to take advantage of him. Marty and Bobby later go to a gay bar, where Marty is told to strip down to his underwear and dance for money, while Bobby takes pleasure in his humiliation.

Lisa eventually proposes that the group murder Bobby. Ali recruits her new boyfriend, the pot-smoking and acid-dropping Donny (Michael Pitt), and his troubled friend, Heather Swallers (Kelli Garner), who has recently been released from rehab; Lisa recruits her cousin, the shy and nerdy Derek Dzvirko (Daniel Franzese). They initially plan to kill Bobby with a gun stolen from Lisa's mother. Ali and Lisa take Bobby to the Everglades, with the plan that Lisa will shoot him while he has sex with Ali, but Lisa finds herself unable to do it. Realizing they need help, the group hire a supposed "hitman", Derek Kaufman (Leo Fitzpatrick), a friend of Ali's who is in actuality a tough-talking young man several years older than them.

With Kaufman's help, they orchestrate a new plan: they all drive to a remote canal, where Ali again lures Bobby with sex. Heather haphazardly initiates a signal to begin the murder, and Donny stabs Bobby in the back of the neck. Horrified by the violence, Ali, Heather, and Dzvirko run back to Ali's car. Bobby begs for mercy, but Marty stabs him in the stomach, disemboweling him, before slitting his throat. Kaufman proceeds to bludgeon Bobby with a baseball bat. Lisa witnesses it all, never turning away. They dump Bobby in the swamp, and presume alligators will consume his corpse.

Marty later realizes that he left the sheath to his diving knife at the canal. They go to retrieve the sheath, and check on the corpse, which is now being eaten by crabs. Lisa, Dzvirko, Ali, and Heather do not believe they did anything wrong, since they did not directly participate in Bobby's actual death. Lisa decides to dispose of the knife, which is the only evidence linking them to the crime.

Unable to maintain the secret, Dzvirko and Lisa reveal to their other friends what they've done, while Ali phones in an anonymous tip to the media, alerting them to Bobby's death. Lisa calls Kaufman and speaks to his younger brother, who says that Kaufman has already been arrested for the murder. Eventually, all the teenagers turn themselves in, with the exception of Marty, who is subsequently arrested. Some time later, the group appear in court, wearing prison jumpsuits, with Lisa visibly pregnant by this time. Marty and Donny begin to argue, leading the others to join in as they each respectively deny their culpability in front of an onlooking courtroom.

Title cards reveal their convictions: Derek Kaufman, Donny, and Lisa receive life sentences, Ali receives 40 years, Derek Dzvirko receives 11 years, Heather receives 7 years, and Marty is sentenced to death.

Cast

Production

Basis
The film is based on the July 14, 1993 murder of Bobby Kent at a remote area in Weston, Florida, south of Alligator Alley. Four of the convicted teens, known as the Broward County Seven, were released after serving brief prison terms. Only three are still serving prison sentences as of May, 2022. The book, Bully: A True Story of High School Revenge by Jim Schutze was released in 1998. The film includes two title cards that reveal how several of the perpetrators appealed their sentences and the results of those actions.

The actual co-perpetrators of the murder were convicted and sentenced as follows:
 Martin Joseph "Marty" Puccio Jr. - First-degree murder and conspiracy to commit murder. Sentenced to death by electrocution on July 27, 1995; commuted to life in prison without the possibility of parole for 25 years on November 20, 1997. Currently incarcerated at the Desoto Annex in Arcadia, Florida.
 Heather June Swallers - Second-degree murder and conspiracy to commit first-degree murder. Was sentenced to seven years' imprisonment on May 12, 1995; she received a lighter sentence than the others because, unlike Derek Dzvirko, she did not attempt to lie on the witness stand. Released February 14, 1998.
 Derek George Dzvirko - Second-degree murder and conspiracy to commit first-degree murder. He was originally sentenced to seven years' imprisonment on May 12, 1995, but received four extra years for trying to lie on the witness stand. Released October 1, 1999.
 Alice Jean "Ali" Willis (aka Alice Jean Chapman, Alice Jean Slay) - Second-degree murder and conspiracy to commit second-degree murder. Sentenced to 40 years' imprisonment on May 19, 1995; reduced on appeal to 17 years for the murder charge and 15 years for the conspiracy charge. Released on Supervised Probation September 16, 2001 (the movie notes she will be under those probationary terms for 40 years). Currently residing in Belpre, Ohio. Probation set to terminate September 15, 2041.
 Donald Daniel "Donny" Semenec Jr. - Second-degree murder. Sentenced to life in prison on May 17, 1995. Two weeks after his conviction in the murder of Bobby Kent, Donny received another 14-month sentence for bringing drugs into jail and cocaine possession stemming from a 1994 case. Currently incarcerated at the Lake Correctional Institution in Clermont, Florida.
 Derek Leon Kaufman - First-degree murder and conspiracy to commit first-degree murder. Sentenced to life plus 30 years' imprisonment on June 12, 1995. On November 15, 1994, Kaufman received a 30-month sentence for trafficking in stolen property, stemming from a February 1993 case. , he is incarcerated at the Mayo Correctional Institution in Mayo, Florida.
 Lisa Marie Connelly - Second-degree murder and conspiracy to commit aggravated battery with a deadly weapon. Sentenced to life plus five years' imprisonment on July 21, 1995; reduced on appeal to 22 years. Released on February 3, 2004. Lisa delivered her and Puccio's daughter in the Broward County Jail during her incarceration.

Casting
Larry Clark said he had a hard time acquiring the funding for this movie but with the up-and-coming Bijou Phillips in the leading female role, the financiers finally agreed. Despite this, he stated in a 2016 podcast that he has little to no respect for Phillips, saying "Everybody was fucking her and I just found it disgusting, man. And the first time I met her, she came to me in this club and sat down next to me, put her arm around me, took my cigarette out of my mouth and started smoking it. And she started talking to me, hugging me and kinda feeling me up. She hadn't acted, but that name - because she was in the paper every day for being a club kid and doing nothing - that name got us the money to get financed."

Filming
Principal photography of Bully began August 21, 2000, in southern Florida.

Critical reception
Bully received mixed reviews from critics and has a "Rotten" rating of 55% on Rotten Tomatoes based on 91 reviews with an average score of 5.8 out of 10. The critical consensus states "With its lingering shots of naked teenage bodies, Bully feels more sordidly exploitative than realistic." The film holds a score of 45 out of 100 on Metacritic, based on 26 critics indicating 'Mixed or average reviews'.

Roger Ebert was one of the film's notable admirers and gave the film four out of four stars and stated in his review "Larry Clark's Bully calls the bluff of movies that pretend to be about murder but are really about entertainment. His film has all the sadness and shabbiness, all the mess and cruelty and thoughtless stupidity of the real thing...If the director doesn't have a strong personal feeling about material like this, he shouldn't be making movies about it...Clark is not some objectified, outside adult observer making an after-school special, but an artist who has made a leap into this teenage mindscape...I believe Bully is a masterpiece on its own terms, a frightening indictment of a society that offers absolutely nothing to some of its children—and an indictment of the children, who lack the imagination and courage to try to escape. Bobby and his killers deserve one another."

Accolades

Home media
The film was released in DVD on January 29, 2002.

Soundtrack
 JT Money feat. Solé: "Who Dat"
 Tha Dogg Pound: "We About to Get Fucc'd Up"
 Ghetto Inmates: "Thug Ass Bitch"
 Atomic Babies: "Cetch Da Monkey"
 Tha Dogg Pound: "Coastin"
 Bomber: "Joyride"
 Rinka: "Boots Sex Dread"
 Tricky: "Excess"
 Dr. Dre feat. Eminem: "Forgot About Dre"
 Sen Dog and DJ FM: "Latin Thug"
 Smut Peddlers feat. R.A. the Rugged Man: "Bottom Feeders"
 Cage: "Suicidal Failure"
 Scott Grusin and John Caruso: "Bully's Beauties"
 Quark: "Je T'ai Oublié"
 Shawty: "Who Ya Callin' Country"
 Tha Dogg Pound: "Work Dat Pussy"
 FOG: "By This Axe We Rule" taken from "Through The Eyes of Night..." WWII MUSIC under license from Dark Horizon Records
 Ol' Dirty Bastard: "Last Call"
 Bizzy Bone: "Jesus"
 Cypress Hill: "When the Shit Goes Down"
 Thurston Moore: "Bully Murder Scene"
 Fatboy Slim: "Song for Shelter (Talking 'Bout My Baby)"
 Tricky: "Bury the Evidence"
 Zoe Poledouris: "Unloved: The Decision"
 Zoe Poledouris and Jerome Dillon: "Window: Lisa Wakes"
 Zoe Poledouris and Jerome Dillon: "Window: It's Bobby"
 Zoe Poledouris and Jerome Dillon: "Window: Gun One"
 Zoe Poledouris and Jerome Dillon: "Window: Heather's Story"

See also
 River's Edge
 Mean Creek

References

External links
 
 
 

2001 films
2001 crime drama films
2001 crime thriller films
2001 independent films
2001 LGBT-related films
2001 psychological thriller films
2001 thriller drama films
2000s psychological drama films
2000s teen drama films
American crime drama films
American crime thriller films
American films about revenge
American independent films
American LGBT-related films
American psychological drama films
American psychological thriller films
American teen drama films
American thriller drama films
Crime films based on actual events
Drama films based on actual events
2000s English-language films
Film4 Productions films
Films about bullying
Films based on non-fiction books
Films directed by Larry Clark
Films set in 1993
Films set in Florida
Films shot in Florida
Films shot in Los Angeles
French crime drama films
French crime thriller films
English-language French films
French films about revenge
French independent films
French LGBT-related films
French psychological drama films
French psychological thriller films
French teen drama films
French thriller drama films
Juvenile sexuality in films
LGBT-related films based on actual events
LGBT-related thriller drama films
Lionsgate films
StudioCanal films
Teen crime films
Teen thriller films
Teensploitation
Thriller films based on actual events
Films produced by Don Murphy
2000s American films
2000s French films